"Always There" is a 1975 song by Ronnie Laws and William Jeffrey from Laws' album Pressure Sensitive. After producer Wayne Henderson of The Crusaders enlisted lyricist Paul B Allen III to create a vocal version of the tune, officially making Allen a co-writer, it was re-recorded in 1976 by R&B group Side Effect for their third album, What You Need. It was a minor hit, reaching the top 5 on the US Dance chart; however it was a larger hit for Incognito & Jocelyn Brown in 1991, whose version reached no. 6 in the UK.

Incognito and Jocelyn Brown version 

On 17 June 1991, the song was covered and released by British acid jazz band Incognito and American R&B and dance singer Jocelyn Brown, whose version was the biggest version in the UK. This was Incognito's breakthrough hit; however, Brown had been well-known and popular since the late 70s. The song was released as the second single from their second album, Inside Life (1991). It peaked at number two in the Netherlands and number six in the UK.

Critical reception 
AllMusic editor David Jeffries said that "the club side of the band is represented best by the disco flashback "Always There" with Jocelyn Brown." Larry Flick from Billboard wrote that they "delivers a domestic version of an R&B houser that has already jammed hard here in clubs". He stated that the track "kicks a tough enough bass line" and complimented the performance from Brown "to push it over the top". He also added that portions of the song's hook have also been prominently featured on "Such a Good Feeling" by English electronic music trio Brothers In Rhythm. 

Pan-European magazine Music & Media commented that "with the numerous dance acts of today, only the really good singers can take a song above average level. Thanks to guest vocalist/shouter Jocelyn Brown, that's exactly what happens here." Alan Jones from Music Week stated that Brown is "proving she's still a devastating diva", viewing the track as "a surefire smash." On the 1996 remix, Jeremy Newall from the magazine's RM Dance Update noted that "Jocelyn gives her most heartfelt vocal delivery in some time." Lindsay Baker from Spin described it as a "stirring rendition".

Chart performance 
"Always There" was a major hit on the charts in Europe and remains the band's most successful song to date. It peaked at number two in Luxembourg and the Netherlands, where it held that position for two weeks, being held off reaching the top spot by Bryan Adams' "(Everything I Do) I Do It For You". The single made it to the Top 10 also in Belgium, Switzerland and the United Kingdom. In the latter, it peaked at number six in its third week at the UK Singles Chart, on July 7, 1991. Additionally, "Always There" was a Top 20 hit in Germany and Sweden, and on the Eurochart Hot 100, it peaked at number 21, while peaking at number nine on the European Dance Radio Chart. Outside Europe, it charted in the United States, reaching number 31 on the Billboard Dance Club Songs chart.

Track listing 
 7" single

 12" single

Charts

Side Effect version

Incognito & Jocelyn Brown version

Weekly charts

Year-end charts

References

External links
 Side Effect - Always There on Discogs
 Incognito Featuring Jocelyn Brown - Always There on Discogs

1975 songs
1976 debut singles
1991 singles
1996 singles
Jocelyn Brown songs
Disco songs
House music songs
Fantasy Records singles
Talkin' Loud singles
Music Week number-one dance singles